Anna Beck (born 24 November 1979) is a Swedish Para-cyclist who represented Sweden in the 2020 Summer Paralympics.

Career
Beck represented Sweden at the 2020 Summer Paralympics and won a silver medal in the women's road race C1–3 and women's road time trial C1–3.

References

Living people
1979 births
Swedish female cyclists
Cyclists at the 2020 Summer Paralympics
Medalists at the 2020 Summer Paralympics
Paralympic medalists in cycling
Paralympic silver medalists for Sweden
20th-century Swedish women
21st-century Swedish women